Shanghai Datong High School, is a public high school in Huangpu District, Shanghai, China. It is an "experimental and demonstrative high school", a government designation awarded to outstanding high schools in Shanghai since 2005.

Originally affiliated with Utopia University, a private university founded in 1912 promoting all-round education, Datong High School remained its high performance both in academic achievements and extracurricular activities.  While students are encouraged by school's administration and faculty to engage in various sports teams and extracurricular clubs, Datong High School also has the highest percentage of students who get accepted into first-rank colleges in China among all the high schools in Huangpu District.

The school also has an international division, the International Education Exchange Center of Shanghai Datong High School (DIEEC). Distinguished alumni have achieved recognition in various areas, including scientific research, entertainment, media, sports and politics.

Campus

Shanghai Datong High School is located on 353 Nanchezhan Road, Shanghai, opposite Penglai Park and close to the site of Expo 2010. Nearby metro lines are Nanpu Bridge Station (line 4) and South Xizang Road Station (line 4 & line 8). It covers an area of 8.29 acres and has 5 buildings, 1 residence hall, a standard size sports field with 40-meter plastic tracks and an outdoor basketball court.

Datong Square
Datong Square is an architectural work built in 2012 in response to school's hundredth anniversary. Since its completion, it has become a major landscape on campus. Datong Square mainly consists of a symbolic gate, a fountain and a mosaic art.

Min De Building

Min De Building is located to the left side of Datong Square. As one of two teaching building, Min De Building serves as the main teaching facility for senior students (grade 12) and school's intentional division. The building's teaching spaces include about 35 classrooms and 2 multi-purpose rooms. It also hosts a male dormitory on the sixth floor and has an underground parking space.

Jin Qu Building

Right opposite to Min De Building, Jin Qu Building is another main teaching building. It serves especially for freshmen and sophomores (grade 10-11). The sixth floor is also used as a male dormitory.

Zi De Building

Zi De Building was renovated in 2012 and specifically houses laboratories for physics, chemistry, biology education.

Shi Xing Building

Shi Xing Building serves as a multi-purpose building including a 700- and 200- seat auditorium, a one-story library, several computer labs, and conference rooms. It also hosts school's television station and school's administrative offices.

San Cheng Building
Shi Xing Building is another multi-purpose building mainly for dining and indoor sports. It houses a two-story cafeteria, an indoor stadium, a gymnastics room and several music rooms. San Cheng Building provides most available spaces for school's sports clubs, such as Taekwondo club, Pin Pong club, and badminton club.

Wei Xin Hall

Wei Xin Hall is a female dormitory and sometimes also hosts for international exchange students.

Physical facilities

The campus features a standard size sports field with 40-meter plastic tracks, which is exclusive among local high schools.

History
In 1912, Chinese mathematician and educator, Hu Dunfu, founded Utopia School (Datong School), the first private school after the Xinhai Revolution. The school was located on today's Zhaozhou South Road at Huangpu District of Shanghai. Two years later the school was moved to Nanchezhan Road, the current location of Datong High School.

In September 1922, Utopia School was approved by the Ministry of Education of China as a university and changed its name to Utopia University (Datong University). It became one of the best private universities in the 1920s. Enrollment grew to about 600 students.

In 1928 Utopia University covered about 6 acres and had a campus of 15 buildings and began setting up its own affiliated high school.  The affiliated high school was later divided into two divisions, which are now Datong High School and Wusi High School.

In 1952 Utopia University was closed in Communist China's reorganization of higher education. Some faculties of the college were incorporated into other universities in Shanghai, but its affiliated high schools, Datong High School and Wusi High School, have remained to the present.

Academia
As one of the first class public schools in Shanghai, Datong High School has trained many national and municipal academic winners in various disciplines. Each year 80% of students get admissions from best universities in China and school's best-college acceptance rate continuously ranks first among high schools in Huangpu District, Shanghai.

Football
The school's football (soccer) teams have a long history of achievement on the local, national levels. “In June, 2014 Datong football team won first place in Shanghai School Football Cup. In 2014 National Games of China, the football team won the championship representing Shanghai. In December 2014 Coca-Cola Shanghai School Football League, school's football team won the tournament by sweeping the board with not goals against.

Notable alumni
Datong High School has educated 39 academicians of Chinese Academy of Sciences and Engineering.

Other notable alumni include:
 Hua Junwu, manhua artist, former vice-chairman of the China Artists Association
 Qian Qichen, former Foreign Minister of China
 Qian Zhengying, former Minister of Water Resources
 Tao Luna, Olympic Pistol Shooting gold medalist
 Yan Jici, former vice president of the Chinese Academy of Sciences
 Yu Guangyuan, philosopher and economist
 Yuan Ming, TV broadcaster
 Zeng Peiyan, former Vice Premier of China
 Zhu Jianhua, former high jump world record keeper

International exchange
Datong High School has established international partnerships and exchange programs with around 27 schools around the world. Each year the school receives foreign exchange students from different countries and organized domestic students for a return visit. During the exchange period, they are usually being exposed to Chinese handwriting, martial arts and other traditions. Some exchange students also participate in school clubs like Taekwondo club. Usually a long term exchange program lasts up to 3 months and short exchange program lasts for one to two weeks.

Sister schools
 Phillips Academy (U.S) 
 Mountain View Academy (U.S) 
 Penleigh and Essendon Grammar School (Australia) 
 North Sydney Girls High School (Australia) 
 Prince Alfred College  (Australia) 
 St Paul's Grammar School (Australia) 
 Lycée Chaptal (France) 
 Institution Robin Saint Vincent de Paul (France)
 Walddörfer-Gymnasium Hamburg (Germany) 
 東葉高等学校 (Japan) 
 市川中学校・高等学校 (Japan) 
 Rutherford College (New Zealand) 
 Columba College (New Zealand) 
 St. Clement's School (Canada) 
 Gymnasium Interlaken (Swiss) 
 College du sud (Swiss) 
 The Chinese High School (Singapore)
 National Junior College (Singapore)

References

High schools in Shanghai
1912 establishments in China
Educational institutions established in 1912
Utopia University